Herbert Smith is a law firm based in London.

Herbert, Herbie, or Herb Smith may also refer to:

Academics
Herbert Smith (mineralogist) (1872–1953), British mineralogist
Herbert Huntingdon Smith (1851–1919), American naturalist
G. Herbert Smith, American educator

Arts
Herbert Greenhough Smith (1855–1935), first editor of the Strand Magazine
Herbert Smith (producer) (1901–1986), British film producer and director
Herbert Tyson Smith (1883–1972), English sculptor
Herbert Smith, regular on the BBC Radio comedy The Clitheroe Kid
Herbert Smith (art director) (1916–2006), production designer for the 1965 movie The Hill

Sports
Herbert Smith (footballer, born 1877) (1877–1951), English international footballer, gold medalist in the 1908 Olympics
Herbert Smith (half-back), English footballer for Port Vale
Herbert Smith (forward), English footballer for Bradford City
Herbert Smith (rugby league), English rugby league footballer of the 1920s for Great Britain, England, Bradford Northern, and Halifax
Herbert Smith (rugby league, born 1915) (1915–?), English rugby league footballer of the 1930s and 1940s for Batley Shamrocks, Castleford, Bramley, Batley, and Bradford Northern
Herbert Smith (baseball), Negro league baseball player
Herbert L. Smith, American football player and coach
Herbie Smith (cricketer) (1914–1997), Australian cricketer
Herbie Smith (footballer) (1895–1959), Australian rules footballer
Herb Smith (1906–?), American baseball player

Other
Herbert Smith (trade unionist) (1862–1938), British miners' union leader; subject of The Man in the Cap by Jack Lawson
Herbert Smith (politician) (1871–1935), Australian politician
Sir Herbert Smith, 1st Baronet (1872–1943), English carpet manufacturer
Herbert Smith (aircraft designer) (1889–1977), British aircraft designer
Herbert H. Smith (1898–?), American politician
Herbert D. Smith (1926–2011), attorney in Oklahoma
Herbert Smith (businessman), British businessman in Hong Kong

See also
Bert Smith (disambiguation)

Smith, Herbert